Aakhri Ghulam is a 1989 Indian Hindi-language action film directed by Shibu Mitra. It stars Mithun Chakraborty, Sonam in lead roles, along with Moushumi Chatterjee, Raj Babbar, Raza Murad, Ranjeet, Shakti Kapoor, Anupam Kher in other important roles.

Plot 
This is story of Bheema who serves tyrant zamindar Daulat Singh's family from generations. One day he revolts and challenges them.

Cast
Mithun Chakraborty as Bheema
Sonam as Sonam Singh
Moushumi Chatterjee as Kumar's Wife
Raj Babbar as Kumar
Raza Murad as Jaggu Dada
Ranjeet as Shera
Shakti Kapoor as Banwarilal
Anupam Kher as Rai Bahadur Daulat Singh
Saeed Jaffrey as Fakeer
Viju Khote as Munim
Jagdish Raj as Jailor
Shiva Rindani as Shiva
Tej Sapru as Shamsher Singh
Anu Kapoor as Dinu

Soundtrack
"Pyar Mila To Jana Yeh Dil Ne" - Asha Bhosle, Shabbir Kumar, Shailendra Singh
"Sathiya O Sathiya" (Part-1) - Asha Bhosle, Shabbir Kumar
"Sathiya O Sathiya" (Part-2) - Uttara Kelkar, Sarika Kapoor
"Malik Mere" - K. J. Yesudas
"Dil Ki Kitaab Hoon" - Alisha Chinai

References

External links
 

1989 films
1980s Hindi-language films
1980s action drama films
1980s crime action films
Indian action drama films
Indian crime action films
Films scored by Bappi Lahiri
1989 action films